For people with the surname, see Satti (surname).

The Satti are a tribe found in Kotli Sattian an administrative division of Rawalpindi District, Kahuta and other adjoining areas of Punjab.

References

Punjabi tribes